Ethan Gordon Hankins (born May 23, 2000) is an American professional baseball pitcher in the Cleveland Guardians organization.

Amateur career
Hankins attended Forsyth Central High School in Cumming, Georgia. As a junior in 2017, he had a 0.90 earned run average (ERA) with 77 strikeouts in  innings pitched and was named the Forsyth County News Pitcher of the Year. After the season, he played in the Under Armour All-America Baseball Game and played for the USA Baseball 18U National Team.

Professional career
Hankins committed to Vanderbilt University to play college baseball. He was drafted 35th overall by the Cleveland Indians in the 2018 Major League Baseball draft. After the draft, Hankins signed to play baseball at Chipola College. However, he eventually signed with Cleveland rather than attend college.

Hankins made his professional debut with the Arizona League Indians, pitching three innings. He began 2019 with the Mahoning Valley Scrappers before being promoted to the Lake County Captains in August. Over 14 games (13 starts) between the two clubs, he pitched to a 0–3 record with a 2.55 ERA, striking out 71 over sixty innings. He did not play a minor league game in 2020 due to the cancellation of the season, and missed all of the 2021 season after undergoing Tommy John surgery.

References

External links

2000 births
Living people
People from Cumming, Georgia
Sportspeople from the Atlanta metropolitan area
Baseball players from Georgia (U.S. state)
Baseball pitchers
Arizona League Indians players
Mahoning Valley Scrappers players
Lake County Captains players